The Tale about the Painter in Love is a 1987 Soviet drama film directed by Nadezhda Kosheverova.

Plot 
The film tells about the young and cheerful painter Makar, who was invited to the king’s palace. There he met a beautiful princess, whom he immediately fell in love with, but he was expelled from the palace. Makar has to go through many trials before realizing that the one he saw in the palace is not a beautiful princess at all, but an ugly maid.

Cast 
 Nikolay Stotskiy
 Nina Urgant
 Olga Volkova
 Valeriy Ivchenko
 Yekaterina Golubeva
 Dmitriy Iosifov		
 Aleksandr Grave
 Sergey Filippov
 Georgiy Shtil
 Mariya Barabanova

References

External links 
 

1987 films
1980s Russian-language films
Soviet drama films
1987 drama films
Films based on fairy tales
Films directed by Nadezhda Kosheverova